Krenkel is a German surname of:
 Erich Krenkel (1880-1964), German geologist
 Ernst (Teodorovich) Krenkel (also ; 1903, Tartu –, Moscow), Baltic German Russian/Soviet Arctic explorer, and doctor of geographical sciences
 Roy Gerald Krenkel, "RGK" (1918, ? – 1983), American illustrator
 Werner A. Krenkel (born 1926, Altmittweida, Saxony), German classical philologist
 Nate Krenkel (born 1973, ?), American Sony publishing executive

Places
Krenkel Bay, Severnaya Zemlya

See also 
 Heiss Island (also ), named after Ernst Krenkel
 Krankl
 
 Kringel (disambiguation)

References 

German-language surnames